is an American brand of instant ramen noodles introduced in 1970 by Nissin Foods.

History 

Instant noodles were invented in 1958 by Momofuku Ando, the Taiwanese-born founder of the Japanese food company Nissin. He used Chicken Ramen as the first brand of instant ramen noodles.

Nissin established the brand Top Ramen in 1970. Ando desired to enter the US markets, but discovered that most people in the US did not have ramen sized bowls leading him to later develop the Cup Noodles brand. In 1972, Top Ramen was introduced to the United States after Ando saw growth potential of ramen products in US markets. Top Ramen became a major corporate force in the international noodle market which was dominated by Maggi.

The brand is popular among US college students. Andy Kryza of Thrillist ranked Top Ramen as the fourth best instant noodle brand.

It is currently a top selling instant noodle brand.

See also 

 Frozen noodles
 Instant noodles
 List of instant noodle brands
 Maruchan manufacturer of instant noodles
 Noodles
 Pot Noodle
 Sapporo Ichiban manufacturer of instant noodles

References

External links 
 

Ramen
Instant noodle brands